Hoseynabad-e Dartang (also Romanized as Ḩoseynābād-e Dartang; also known as Ḩoseynābād) is a village in Cham Chamal Rural District, Bisotun District, Harsin County, Kermanshah Province, Iran. At the 2006 census, its population was 30, in 10 families.

References 

Populated places in Harsin County